List of drama films is a chronological listing of films in the drama genre.

List of drama films of the 1900s
List of drama films of the 1910s
List of drama films of the 1920s
List of drama films of the 1930s
List of drama films of the 1940s
List of drama films of the 1950s
List of drama films of the 1960s
List of drama films of the 1970s
List of drama films of the 1980s
List of drama films of the 1990s
List of drama films of the 2000s
List of drama films of the 2010s
List of drama films of the 2020s

 
Drama films